Don Loper (April 29, 1906 – November 21, 1972) was an American costume and necktie designer, as well as a screenwriter, choreographer, associate producer, actor,  and assistant to MGM musicals producer Arthur Freed. He began his career as a dancer and was teamed with Ginger Rogers in the film Lady in the Dark (1944).

Loper is also known for introducing Judy Garland to her future husband, director Vincente Minnelli (Meet Me in St. Louis). Loper was born on April 29, 1906, in Toledo, Ohio, USA as Lincoln George Hardloper. He is known for his work on It's a Pleasure (1945), Sofia (1948) and Lady in the Dark (1944). He was married to Violet Hughes. He died on November 22, 1972, in Santa Monica, California, USA.
Loper's works, some of which were designed for stars like Ella Fitzgerald and Lucille Ball  are featured in the Los Angeles County Museum of Art and the California African American Museum. He played himself in an episode of I Love Lucy titled "The Fashion Show" in 1955. Loper would design stewardess uniforms for Pan Am and Trans World Airlines.

Death
He died at UCLA Medical Center, California, from complications following tracheostomy cuff balloon slippage.

References

External links

1906 births
1972 deaths
American fashion designers
American choreographers
American male screenwriters
American male film actors
20th-century American male actors
American male television actors
20th-century American male writers
20th-century American screenwriters